Pomacentrus littoralis, the Smoky damselfish is a damselfish species described by Georges Cuvier in 1830. Pomacentrus littoralis is part of the genus Pomacentrus and the family Pomacentridae.

References 

littoralis
Taxa named by Georges Cuvier
Fish described in 1830